Brazil first participated at the Olympic Games in 1920, after missing the previous five Summer editions. The country has sent athletes to compete in every Summer Olympic Games since then, except for the 1928 Games. As of 2020, Brazilian athletes have won a total of 150 medals in 18 different Summer sports.

Brazil has also participated in the Winter Olympic Games since 1992. Due to Brazil being mostly a tropical nation, to this date no Brazilian athlete has won an Olympic medal in the winter sports and the country's best result at the Winter Olympics was a ninth place by snowboarder Isabel Clark Ribeiro at the 2006 Winter Olympics.

Volleyball (indoors and beach volley), sailing and judo are Brazil's top medal-producing sports in the Summer editions. The country is also the most decorated in football, with the men's team having seven medals (2 gold, 3 silver and 2 bronze) and the women's team adding two silver medals for a total of nine.

Rio de Janeiro in Brazil was the host city to the 2016 Summer Olympics. This marked the first time that any country in South America has hosted the games. This also marks the first time that a lusophone country hosted any edition of the Olympic Games. Rio was only the second city in Latin America to host the Summer Olympics, after Mexico City in 1968, and Brazil was only the second country of the southern hemisphere to host the Olympics, after Australia in 1956 and 2000.

As the hosts of the 2016 Summer Olympics, Brazil had the second most successful participation at the Summer Olympics to date, earning seven gold medals and nineteen medals overall. The nation's most successful overall performance at the Olympics occurred at the 2020 Summer Olympics. Tied with 2016 games in number of gold medals (7) and silver medals (6) but with 2 more bronze medals (8), Brazil became the second nation to surpass its medal total at the Olympics immediately following one that it hosted (the other one was Great Britain in the 2016 Olympics). The country broke the record for medals in one edition (21) and was also in the highest position on medal table on games history (12th place).

One athlete from Brazil has been awarded the Pierre de Coubertin medal: Vanderlei de Lima, a long-distance runner who was attacked by a spectator during the men's marathon at the 2004 edition in Athens, Greece, when he was leading the race. Lima lost two places, winning the bronze medal. In spite of the situation, he still celebrated the third-place, showing good sportsmanship.

The National Olympic Committee for Brazil is the Brazilian Olympic Committee. The entity was created in 1914 and recognized in 1935.

Hosted Games 
Brazil has hosted the Games on one occasion.

Unsuccessful Bids

Medals

Medals by Summer Games

Medals by Winter Games

Medals by Summer sport

Medals by Gender

Flagbearers

Olympic medalists

Multiple medalists 
According to official data of the International Olympic Committee, this is a list of all athletes with at least two Olympic medals representing Brazil. The list is sorted by most gold medals, most silver medals, most bronze medals.

Summary by sport

Alpine skiing

Archery

Artistic swimming

Athletics

Badminton

Basketball

Biathlon

Bobsleigh

Boxing

Canoeing

Cross-country skiing

Cycling

Diving

Equestrian

Fencing

Field hockey

Figure skating

Football

Freestyle skiing

Gymnastics

Golf

Handball

Judo

Luge

Modern pentathlon

Rowing

Rugby sevens

Sailing

Shooting

Skateboarding

Skeleton

Snowboarding

Surfing

Swimming

Table tennis

Taekwondo

Tennis

Triathlon

Volleyball

Water polo

Weightlifting

Wrestling

See also
 Sports in Brazil
 2016 Summer Olympics
 Brazil at the Youth Olympics
 Brazil at the Paralympics
 Tropical nations at the Winter Olympics

Notes

References

External links